Craspedodon (meaning 'edge tooth') is an extinct genus of ornithischian dinosaur, possibly a ceratopsian. It lived during the Late Cretaceous (Santonian stage, around 85 million years ago), in what is now Belgium. Only a few teeth have ever been found, which were described as similar to those of Iguanodon. Craspedodon lonzeensis, described by Louis Dollo in 1883,<ref>Dollo, L., 1883, "Note sur les restes de dinosauriens rencontrées dans le Crétacé supérieure de la Belgique", Bulletin du Musée royale d' Histoire naturelle de Belgique, 2:  205-221</ref> is the type species, although it is considered a nomen dubium since it is based on fragmentary material (teeth only). It was long thought to be an iguanodontian, but a 2007 restudy suggested that it was actually a neoceratopsian, perhaps closer to Ceratopsoidea than Protoceratopsidae.  If the reidentification is correct, Craspedodon'' would be the first neoceratopsian known from Europe.

See also

 Timeline of ceratopsian research

References

Ceratopsians
Santonian life
Late Cretaceous dinosaurs of Europe
Fossils of Belgium
Fossil taxa described in 1883
Nomina dubia